Blå vind is a 2002 studio album by Candela. For the album, the band was awarded a Grammis Award in the "Dansband of the Year" category.

Track listing
Inom mig (Per-Anders Forsén)
Det är bara du (Jonas Sandquist)
Vinterbarn (Jonas Warnerbring - Fredrik Möller)
Some Days You Gotta Dance (Troy Johnson - Marshall Logan)
En ros i regn (Roland Andersson - Ingegerd Lindh - Lasse Lindh)
Du eller jag (Peter Lundblad - Bengt Palmers)
Jah finns där (Calle Kindbom - Carl Lösnitz)
Your Mama Don't Dance (Kennt Loggins - Jim Messina)
Minnet av dig ( Jan Gustavsson - Eva-Maria Lidèn)
Det måste va' kärlek (Ulf Brusquini - Billy Heil - Åke Lindfors)
Blå vind (Calle Kindbom - Carl Lösnitz)
Steg för steg (Tommy Kaså - Anica E. Stenberg)
Stanna en stund (PeO Pettersson)
Jag önskar mig (Per-Ola Lindholm)

References 

2002 albums
Candela (Swedish band) albums